Halobacillus trueperi is a species of bacteria. It is halophilic, gram-positive, heterotrophic and its type strain is DSM 10404T (= SL-5T).

References

Further reading
Ripka, Katrin, et al. "Molecular characterisation of Halobacillus strains isolated from different medieval wall paintings and building materials in Austria."International biodeterioration & biodegradation 58.3 (2006): 124–132.

External links

LPSN
Type strain of Halobacillus trueperi at BacDive -  the Bacterial Diversity Metadatabase

Bacillaceae
Bacteria described in 1996